A herpolhode is the curve traced out by the endpoint of the angular velocity vector ω of a rigid rotor, a rotating rigid body. The endpoint of the angular velocity moves in a plane in absolute space, called the invariable plane, that is orthogonal to the angular momentum vector L. The fact that the herpolhode is a curve in the invariable plane appears as  part of Poinsot's construction. 

The trajectory of the angular velocity around the angular momentum in the invariable plane is a circle in the case of a symmetric top, but in the general case wiggles inside an annulus, while still being concave towards the angular momentum.

See also
Poinsot's construction
Polhode

References
H. Goldstein, Classical Mechanics, Addison-Wesley (1950), p. 159 ff.

V. I. Arnold, Mathematical Methods of Classical Mechanics, Second edition, Springer (1989), p. 146. 

Rigid bodies
Mechanics